Juan R. Correa-Pérez, Ph.D. (born May 3, 1968, in San Juan, Puerto Rico) is a scientist credited with becoming the first (doctoral level) clinical Andrologist and Embryologist established in Puerto Rico (1998). He has a particular interest and expertise in male-factor infertility. He is also certified as a High-Complexity Clinical Laboratory Director (HCLD) by the American Board of Bioanalysis ABB) in the disciplines of Andrology and Embryology.

Dr. Correa-Pérez is a lecturer in the related fields of OB/GYN and urology. He has served as school of medicine faculty, an ad hoc member of the editorial staff of Fertility and Sterility (a leading medical journal in the field of reproductive medicine) and a reviewer for several other outstanding journals in the field, including Theriogenology, Journal of Men’s Health, The Journal of Infectious Diseases, Clinical Infectious Diseases and the Middle East Fertility Society Journal. He is also currently serving as an Editorial Board Member for The Scientific World Journal-Urology and The Open Andrology Journal.

He has been honored as an Ad Hoc member of the editorial board of Fertility and Sterility, The Official Journal of the American Society for Reproductive Medicine and has been nominated for the Annual Royan International Research Award twice. Dr. Correa-Pérez has been invited to present his research internationally in both print and presentation formats.

References

See also

List of Puerto Ricans
Puerto Rican scientists and inventors
University of Puerto Rico at Mayaguez people

Puerto Rican andrologists
Developmental biologists
Embryologists
People from San Juan, Puerto Rico
1968 births
Living people